Praematoliparis anarthractae is a species of snailfish native to the southeastern Pacific Ocean near Chile where it can be found at depths down to  though usually not deeper than .  This species is the only known member of its genus.

References

Liparidae
Monotypic fish genera
Fish described in 1989
Taxa named by Anatoly Andriyashev